Jijoca de Jericoacoara is the northernmost municipality in the Brazilian state of Ceará, near the city of Cruz. It is known for its eponymous beach and national park. It is served by Jericoacoara airport, which opened in 2017.

Name 
The word Jericoacoara comes from the indigenous Tupi language and means "lair of turtles", from  "sea turtle" and  "lair, hole".

History 
A fact of some historical significance is the report of Vicente Yáñez Pinzón (Captain of Nau Niña, the fleet of Christopher Columbus), which anchored in the bay of Jericoacoara in 1499. But this was not official at the time as a result of the Treaty of Tordesillas, which was signed in the same year.

References

Populated places established in 1991
Populated coastal places in Ceará
1991 establishments in Brazil
Municipalities in Ceará